Iris Parush is an Israeli scholar of Hebrew literature. Parush's work includes the study of the cultural and ideological development of Haskalah literature as well as the impact of nationalist ideologies on modern Hebrew literature.

Background 
Iris Parush is a professor of Hebrew literature at Ben Gurion University.

Publications

Books 
 Reading Jewish Women: Marginality and Modernization in Nineteenth-Century Eastern European Jewish Society (Brandeis University Press, 2004)
 Sin of Writing and the Rise of Modern Hebrew Literature (Palgrave Macmillan, 2021)

Selected articles 
 Parush, I. (1997). Women readers as agents of social change among Eastern European Jews in the late nineteenth century. Gender & History, 9(1), 60-82.
 Parush, I., & Brener, A. (1995). The Politics of Literacy: Women and Foreign Languages in Jewish Society of 19th-Century Eastern Europe. Modern Judaism, 183-206.
 Parush, I., & Sternberg, S. (2004). Another Look at "The Life of 'Dead' Hebrew": Intentional Ignorance of Hebrew in Nineteenth-Century Eastern European Jewish Society. Book History, 7(1), 171-214.

Awards 
  Zalman Shazar Prize for Jewish History

See also 
 Menachem Brinker, Parush's doctoral advisor

References 

Living people
Israeli Hebraists
Academic staff of Ben-Gurion University of the Negev
Year of birth missing (living people)